The Downs–Thomson paradox (named after Anthony Downs and John Michael Thomson), also known as the Pigou–Knight–Downs paradox (after Arthur Cecil Pigou and Frank Knight), states that the equilibrium speed of car traffic on a road network is determined by the average door-to-door speed of equivalent journeys taken by public transport.

It is a paradox in that improvements in the road network will not reduce traffic congestion. Improvements in the road network can make congestion worse if the improvements make public transport more inconvenient or if they shift investment, causing disinvestment in the public transport system.

Consequence
The general conclusion, if the paradox applies, is that expanding a road system as a remedy to congestion is ineffective and often even counterproductive. That is known as Lewis–Mogridge position and was extensively documented by Martin Mogridge in the case study of London on his 1990 book Travel in towns: jam yesterday, jam today and jam tomorrow?

A 1968 article by Dietrich Braess pointed out the existence of the counterintuitive occurrence on networks: Braess's paradox states that adding extra capacity to a network, when the moving entities selfishly choose their route, can in some cases, reduce overall performance.

There is interest in the study of this phenomenon since the same may happen in computer networks as well as transport networks. Increasing the size of the network is characterized by behaviors of users similar to that of travelers on road networks, who act independently and in a decentralized manner in choosing optimal routes between origin and destination is an extension of the induced demand theory and consistent with Downs' 1992 theory of "triple convergence", formulated to explain the difficulty of removing peak congestion from highways. In response to a capacity addition three immediate effects occur: drivers using alternative routes begin to use the expanded highway; those previously traveling at off-peak times (either immediately before or after the peak) shift to the peak (rescheduling behavior as defined previously) and public transport users shift to driving.

Restrictions on validity

According to Downs, the link between average speeds on public transport and private transport applies only "to regions in which the vast majority of peak-hour commuting is done on rapid transit systems with separate rights of way. Central London is an example, since in 2001 around 85 percent of all morning peak-period commuters into that area used public transport (including 77 percent on separate rights of way) and only 11 percent used private cars. When peak-hour travel equilibrium has been reached between the subway system and the major commuting roads, then the travel time required for any given trip is roughly equal on both modes."

See also
 Braess's paradox
 Induced demand
 Marchetti's constant, a corollary of which is that decreasing congestion may increase the distance people are willing to commute and so increase the traffic burden
 Lewis–Mogridge position
 Jevons paradox, an increase in efficiency tends to increase (rather than decrease) the rate of consumption of that resource

References
Notes

Bibliography
 Braess, Dietrich; (1968), Über ein Paradoxon aus der Verkehrsplanung, translated from German as On a Paradox of Traffic Planning by Dietrich Braess, Anna Nagurney, and Tina Wakolbinger (2005), Transportation Science 39/4, 446–450
 Downs, Anthony; (1992), Stuck in Traffic: Coping with Peak-Hour Traffic Congestion, The Brookings Institution, Washington (DC), 
 Mogridge, Martin J. H.; (1990), Travel in towns: jam yesterday, jam today and jam tomorrow? Macmillan Press, London, 
 Thomson, John Michael; (1972), Methods of traffic limitation in urban areas. Working Paper 3, OECD, Paris

External links
 Do Your Buses Get Stuck in Traffic? Traffic solutions & the Downs-Thomson Paradox YouTube video

Road transport
Transport economics
Paradoxes in economics